Richard James Sunley Tice (born 13 September 1964) is a British businessman and right-wing politician who has been Leader of Reform UK (formerly the Brexit Party) since 6 March 2021.

Tice was CEO of the real estate group CLS Holdings from 2010 to 2014, after which he became CEO of the property asset management group Quidnet Capital LLP. He was a founder and co-chairman of the pro-Brexit campaign groups Leave.EU and Leave Means Leave.

Tice helped found the Brexit Party, later rebranded as Reform UK, and was elected as a Member of the European Parliament (MEP) for the East of England constituency at the 2019 European Parliament election. He held this role until the United Kingdom's withdrawal from the EU in January 2020. However, he continued to serve as chairman of the party under Nigel Farage and took office as leader in March 2021.

Early life
Richard James Sunley Tice was born on 13 September 1964 in Farnham, the third child of James S. Tice and the horse trainer and philanthropist Joan Mary Tice DL OBE, who died on 26 April 2019. He is a maternal grandson of the property developer Bernard Sunley.

Tice was educated at the private Uppingham School. He subsequently received a bachelor's degree in construction economics and quantity surveying from the University of Salford.

Property career
After graduation in 1987, Tice's first job was at the housing developer London and Metropolitan. This included time at its Paris office where he learnt French. He then started working for the housebuilding and commercial property company founded by his grandfather called The Sunley Group in 1991. Tice was its joint chief executive officer (CEO) for 14 years before leaving the company in 2006.

Tice then ran his own debt advisory consultancy before joining the property investment group CLS Holdings in 2010. He led major planning property applications in Vauxhall, London. He was its CEO until 2014. He left the company to become the CEO of the property investment firm, Quidnet Capital Partners LLP, having been removed from CLS' board as a result of a potential conflict of interest.

Political career

Conservative Party 
Before joining the Brexit Party, Tice was a long-term donor and member of the Conservative Party.

Tice wrote a 2008 report for the think tank Reform called "Academies: A model education?". In 2017, he co-wrote a pamphlet for the think tank UK 2020, "Timebomb: how the university cartel is failing Britain's students", which included recommendations on how to expand two-year degrees. He produced a follow-up report on student finances called "Defusing the debt timebomb" which he sent to the then Chancellor of the Exchequer, Philip Hammond.

In a May 2018 article on the Conservative Home website, Tice argued for the importance of expanding the availability of homes for people on lower incomes and how this could be achieved more effectively. He felt that crime could also be reduced if housing was better managed.

Euroscepticism
Tice is a Eurosceptic. He was a director of the campaign group, Business for Sterling, which campaigned for the United Kingdom not to join the Euro currency in the late 1990s. Tice donated £1,750 to the Eurosceptic MP David Davis' candidacy in the 2001 Conservative Party leadership election.

In July 2015, Tice co-founded, with the businessman Arron Banks, the pro-Brexit Leave.EU campaign group. It was originally known as The Know.EU before being rebranded in September of that year as Leave.EU. He also donated £38,000 to the pro-Brexit campaign group Grassroots Out. Shortly after the United Kingdom voted to leave the European Union in the June 2016 referendum, he left Leave.EU, and co-founded the pressure group Leave Means Leave. He co-chairs it with the businessman John Longworth. In October 2017, they were placed jointly at Number 90 on Iain Dale's list of the "Top 100 Most Influential People on the Right".

Tice, Banks, Andy Wigmore and Nigel Farage are sometimes referred to by sections of the media as the "Bad Boys of Brexit", a group who facilitated Brexit. He has written a number of articles advocating  a no-deal Brexit. He was the first to use the phrase, "no deal is better than a bad deal" in relation to Brexit in July 2016 which was later used in the then prime minister Theresa May's Lancaster House speech outlining the government's approach to negotiations in January 2017.

Brexit Party and Reform UK 
The Brexit Party, a conservative, Eurosceptic political party, was formed as an incorporated limited company on 23 November 2018, and Tice was appointed a director of it on 8 May 2019. In his role as the chairman of The Brexit Party he regularly represented it, with appearances in the media including BBC Radio 4's Any Questions?. He was the chairman when the party participated in the 2019 European Parliament election, under Nigel Farage's leadership. In that election, it won 29 seats in the European Parliament.

Tice stood as a candidate at the 2019 European Parliament election. He was first on his party's list in the East of England constituency, and was elected as one of three of its MEPs for there. In the European Parliament, he was a member of the Committee on Economic and Monetary Affairs and was part of the delegation for relations with Canada.

In November 2019, it was announced that Tice would be standing as the Brexit Party candidate for the Hartlepool constituency at the 2019 general election. He finished in third place in Hartlepool with 25.8% of the vote.

On 30 October 2020, Farage applied to the Electoral Commission to change the Brexit Party's name to Reform UK. On 6 March 2021, it was announced that Tice would become Leader of Reform UK following Farage's resignation.

In March 2021, Tice announced he would be the Reform UK candidate for the Havering and Redbridge constituency in the 2021 London Assembly election. He came fifth.

In December 2021, Tice stood in the by-election for the Old Bexley and Sidcup constituency following the death of the sitting MP, James Brokenshire. He received 1,432 votes, a 6.6% vote share, and therefore retained his deposit.

Election results

Personal life
Tice is married and has three children. He began a relationship with the journalist Isabel Oakeshott in 2018 and separated from his wife in March 2019.

Tice was a member of the governing body of Northampton Academy between 2005 and 2019 and has also been vice chair of trustees at Uppingham School.

A long-time contributor to the magazine Property Week, Tice is a regular commentator on developments within the property world.

In October 2019, openDemocracy revealed that two offshore companies had owned shares in Tice's family business, Sunley Family Limited, since 1994.

Notes

References

1964 births
Living people
People educated at Uppingham School
Alumni of the University of Salford
British chief executives
British Eurosceptics
Conservative Party (UK) donors
Conservative Party (UK) people
Sunley family
Brexit Party MEPs
MEPs for England 2019–2020
Reform UK parliamentary candidates